1835 Market Street, formerly known as Eleven Penn Center (or 11 Penn Center), is a high-rise building located in the Market West region of Philadelphia. Radnor Corp. the real estate arm of Sun Co. began development of the property in 1984. It opened in 1986 and Colonial Penn was one of the anchor tenants. The architectural firm who designed the building was the Kling Lindquist Partnership. 1835 Market Street is a part of Penn Center complex, which includes several notable skyscrapers such as the Mellon Bank Center and Five Penn Center.

It is currently the 24th-tallest building in Philadelphia.

Ownership

See also

 List of tallest buildings in Philadelphia
 Buildings and architecture of Philadelphia

References

External links
 Emporis
 SkyscraperPage

Skyscraper office buildings in Philadelphia
Office buildings completed in 1986
Penn Center, Philadelphia